Thread is a 2016 Greek film written and directed by Alexander Voulgaris (credited as "The Boy").  It stars Sofia Kokkali, Vangelis Loukissas and Daphne Patakia.  It was distributed worldwide by Heretic Outreach.

Accolades

References

External links

2016 films
2016 drama films
2010s Greek-language films
Greek drama films